Greta Laurent (born 3 May 1992) is an Italian cross-country skier. She competed at the FIS Nordic World Ski Championships 2013 in Val di Fiemme. She competed at the 2014 Winter Olympics in Sochi, where she reached the quarter finals in women's sprint.
and 2018 Winter Olympics in Pyeongchang.

Biography
Born in Ivrea but originally from Gressoney-Saint-Jean, Laurent has been in a relationship with fellow cross-country skier Federico Pellegrino since 2012, having previously been a couple during their school-age careers. Pellegrino dedicated his first World Cup race win in 2014 to Laurent. Since 2012 they have lived in Gressoney-Saint-Jean.

Cross-country skiing results
All results are sourced from the International Ski Federation (FIS).

Olympic Games

World Championships

World Cup

Season standings

References

External links
 

1992 births
Living people
Cross-country skiers at the 2014 Winter Olympics
Cross-country skiers at the 2018 Winter Olympics
Cross-country skiers at the 2022 Winter Olympics
Italian female cross-country skiers
Olympic cross-country skiers of Italy
Sportspeople from Aosta Valley
People from Ivrea
Sportspeople from the Metropolitan City of Turin